Greg Pleasants-Tate (born 12 May 1991) is a New Zealand rugby union player who has played as a hooker for Bay of Plenty, North Harbour, Auckland, Canterbury and Southland in New Zealand's domestic Mitre 10 Cup and the Blues and Highlanders in the international Super Rugby competition.

Early career

Senior career

Despite coming through the youth ranks at North Harbour, Pleasants-Tate made his senior ITM Cup debut with the  Steamers during the 2011 season.   He played 2 seasons of rugby in Rotorua and notched up 11 appearances before switching back to Harbour in 2013 where he played all 10 games in a dismal campaign for the men from Auckland's North Shore in which they would finish bottom of the Championship table.

2014 was not a great season for North Harbour, finishing 5th on the Championship log, however Pleasants-Tate put in some strong performances in the number 1 jersey, starting all 10 games during the regular season and scoring 2 tries. That would prove to be his final season in North Shore City and he made the short move to join ITM Cup Premiership side  for the 2015 ITM Cup.

Super Rugby

Four seasons of solid performances at domestic level saw him finally earn a crack at Super Rugby when the Auckland-based  named him in their wider training group for the 2015 Super Rugby season.   Able to cover both number 1 and 2 jerseys, but having played the previous domestic season as a hooker for Auckland, Pleasants-Tate had to vie with Matt Moulds to provide back up to All Blacks; Keven Mealamu and James Parsons and subsequently only made 1 substitute appearance against the  during what would be his only season with the Blues.

Now focusing almost exclusively on playing hooker, Pleasants-Tate found himself surplus to requirements with the Blues and moved south to Dunedin ahead of the 2016 Super Rugby season to take a place as a member of the  wider training group, providing cover for Liam Coltman and Ash Dixon, the franchise's 2 established hookers. However, Pleasants-Tate, had a productive year and made 7 substitute appearances.

Tony Brown replaced the -bound Jamie Joseph as Highlanders head-coach ahead of the 2017 season and he retained Pleasants-Tate in the squad for the year.

International career

Pleasants-Tate was a member of the New Zealand Under-20 side which won the 2011 IRB Junior World Championship in Italy, playing 2 times and scoring 1 try.

Career Honours

New Zealand Under-20

IRB Junior World Championship - 2011

Super Rugby Statistics

References

1991 births
Living people
New Zealand rugby union players
Rugby union props
Rugby union hookers
Bay of Plenty rugby union players
North Harbour rugby union players
Auckland rugby union players
Blues (Super Rugby) players
Highlanders (rugby union) players
People educated at Takapuna Grammar School
Rugby union players from Whanganui
Canterbury rugby union players
Southland rugby union players